Doctor Habib Shaleh Muhamad Aldjufri, Lc., M.A. (born February 7, 1967) better known as Habib Shaleh is an Indonesian independent politician who is currently serving as the Senator of the Republic of Indonesia (member of the Regional Representative Council of the Republic of Indonesia; DPD RI) from Central Sulawesi. Shaleh began serving as a member of the DPD RI after he ran for the 2009 Indonesian legislative election in the electoral district of Central Sulawesi. He got 78,303 votes, ranked fourth among the candidates who to qualified as a Senator from Central Sulawesi.

Aside from being a Senator, Shaleh has been Chairman of the Alkhairaat Executive Board since 1980. He is also the younger brother of Habib Sayyid Saggaf bin Muhammad Aljufri, Supreme Head of Alkhairaat, and Habib Sayyid Ali bin Muhammad Aljufri, General Chairman of the Alkhairaat Executive Board. All three of them are the sons of Sayyid Muhammad bin Idrus al-Jufri and grandchildren of Habib Idrus bin Salim Al-Jufri, founder of Alkhairaat.

Biography

Early life
Shaleh was born in Palu City on February 7, 1967. His father, Habib Sayyid Muhammad bin Idrus al-Jufri, was the Supreme Head of Alkhairaat in the period 1969–1974 succeeding his grandfather, Habib Sayyid Idrus bin Salim Al-Jufri, who died on December 22, 1969. After his father's death in 1974, the position of supreme head was later replaced by his eldest brother, Habib Sayyid Saggaf bin Muhammad Aljufri. In addition, his another brother, Habib Sayyid Ali bin Muhammad Aljufri, served as General Chairman of Alkhairaat. Habib Ali has also been the Chairman of the Indonesian Ulema Council of Central Sulawesi since 2014.

Education
Shaleh began her education from elementary to high school level in Alkhairaat, Palu. After graduating from high school, like his other family members, he was then sent to Al-Azhar University by his father, Habib Sayyid Muhammad bin Idrus al-Jufri, to study at the undergraduate level there in 1990. After graduating in 1995, he then continued his studies to the master's level at Omdurman Islamic University, Sudan, and graduated with a Master of Arts in 1997.

After a few years of not continuing his studies, in 2008, he then took a doctoral level at Alauddin Islamic State University and graduated with a doctor in 2015.

References

Footnotes

Bibliography

Further reading

 
 
 

1967 births
Living people
Indonesian people of Yemeni descent
People from Palu
Members of the Regional Representative Council
Al-Azhar University alumni
Omdurman Islamic University alumni
Indonesian expatriates in Egypt